Mike Scheidweiler (born 14 November 1981) is a Luxembourger tennis player.

Scheidweiler has a career high ATP singles ranking of 281 achieved on 26 May 2003. He also has a career high ATP doubles ranking of 272 achieved on 30 September 2002.

Scheidweiler represents Luxembourg in the Davis Cup beginning with the 1998 Davis Cup. He is still a member of the Davis Cup team and won a match in the 2016 Davis Cup over Norway.

ATP Challenger and ITF Futures finals

Singles: 7 (4–3)

Doubles: 16 (11–5)

References

External links

1981 births
Living people
Luxembourgian male tennis players